Thiruvarambu is one among the town of Thiruvattar town panchyat. The Thirparappu Falls is 3 km from Thiruvarambu. This having a canal like stream originated from some of the dams (Pechiparai, Perunchani, Kodaiyyar and so on) which provides more enough water to this village. Hence they plant banyan, coconut, banana, rubber, tapioca and other pulses such as pepper.

Location and significance 
Thiruvarambu is located 40 km south of the Trivandrum Metropolitan Region and 35 km from Nagercoil the nearest city. Thiruvarambu is only 12 km away from the commercial towns of Marthandam, 17 km from Thuckalay, 14 km from Kaliyikkavilai-Kerala State border. Two major motorways connect Thiruvarambu to Trivandrum; the National Highway 66 and the Vizhinjam Harbour - Beach Road. The Hill Road which runs through Nedumangadu is also used by some commuters due to heavy traffic congestion in the 2 main roads particularly during peak hours.

Climate 
Thiruvarambu has a same climate changes like Kerala. It has a climate that borders between a tropical savanna climate and a tropical monsoon climate. As a result, it does not experience distinct seasons. The mean maximum temperature 34 °C and the mean minimum temperature is 21 °C. The humidity is high and rises to about 90% during the monsoon season. The dry season sets in by December. December, January and February are the coolest months while March, April and May are the hottest. The lowest temperature in the city core recorded during winter was 16.4 °C on, and the highest temperature recorded in summer is 38.0 °C.[62]. It rains more often in Kanyakumari district than in any other part of Tamil Nadu, with the exception of Chennai.

Standard of Living 
Like Trivandrum/Kerala, Thiruvarambu has high standards of living, top quality medical/educational facilities, low corruption rates and a very stable economy without industrialization activities. Remittances from the Middle East / North Africa / Europe / Singapore and Malaysia add to the steady economy of the region. Rubber plantations and trade constitute the majority of the business in Thiruvarambu. Almost everyone deals with rubber in their day-to-day life, as either planters or workers.

Train 
The nearest railway station from Thiruvarambu is Kuzhithurai(KZT) which is just 12 km away. Several trains to Trivandrum, Nagercoil, Chennai, Madurai, and Mumbai are operated. One must reach Nagercoil(NCJ) or Trivandrum(TVC)for getting long-distance train and the trains which don't have halt in Kuzhithurai.

Air 
Thiruvarambu is served by Trivandrum International Airport which is approximately 45 km away. Thiruvarambu Town is only 12 km away from the southern border of Trivandrum Metropolitan Region and hence considered one of its suburbs even though it lies across the state border. Both Kerala and Tamil Nadu government operates several bus services between the two cities apart from numerous private bus and taxi operators.

Education

Medical colleges 
 Sree RamaKrishna Medical College of Naturopathy and Yogic Sciences
 Sree Mookaambika Institute of Medical Sciences (SMIMS)
 Sarada Krishna Homeopathic Medical College

Dental colleges 
 Sree Mookaambika Institute of Dental Sciences

Arts & science 
 Sri Ramakrishna College of Education

Schools 
 Thiruvarambu Government High School
 Calvary Matriculation School
 Mount Carmel Metric School
 St Johns English School

Religion
The city has many Temples and Churches.

Churches:

 Church of South India, Kuruvikadu.
 Church of South India, Padagacheri.
 The Salvation Army Church, Kolvai(Kolvancheri).
 The Salvation Army Church, Thiruvarambu.
 St.Antony's Church, Thiruvarambu.
 Pentecostal Church, Pulichimavilai.
 Assemblies of God Church, Thiruvarambu.

Temples:
 Sree Aalumoodu Amman Temple, Thiruvarambu.
 Amman Temple, Padagacheri.
 Sivan Temple, Thiruvarambu.

Festivals

The Hindu religious people celebrate Pongal, Deepavali, Saraswati Pooja, Ayutha Pooja, Sivarathri, and other deity festivals.

The Christians celebrate Christmas with United Christians Organization, Church Festivals, Easter and other related festivals. Dalits who live in this area celebrate Ambedkar Jeyanthi, Budh poornima, Ayyankali day and Rettaimalai seenivasan gurupooja.

References

Cities and towns in Kanyakumari district